WTCV (channel 18) is a television station in San Juan, Puerto Rico, serving as the U.S. territory's outlet for the Spanish-language network Mega TV. Owned and operated by Spanish Broadcasting System, it is sister to radio stations WZNT (93.7 FM), WZMT (93.3 FM), WODA (94.7 FM), WNOD (94.1 FM), W276AI (103.1 FM), WRXD (96.5 FM), WNVI (1040 AM), W233CW (94.5 FM), W238CR (95.5 FM), WIOB (97.5 FM), WMEG (106.9 FM) and WEGM (95.1 FM). WTCV shares studios with independent station WJPX (channel 24, owned by América-CV Station Group) at the Amelia Industrial Park in Guaynabo; the two stations share transmitter facilities at Barrio Cubuy in Canovanas.

WTCV operates two satellite stations: WVEO (channel 17) in Aguadilla, with transmitter on Cerro Canto Gallo in Aguada, and WVOZ-TV (channel 36) in Ponce, with transmitter on Sec Servo Paso in Peñuelas.

History
During the 1980s and early 1990s, WTCV was known as WSJU (for San Juan) and was an NBC affiliate, one of three commercial English-language network affiliates broadcasting in Puerto Rico (the others being WPRV-TV and WUJA) during the 80s. Around 1990, the station also carried the Home Shopping Network programming during most of the late-morning and afternoon hours. There are now four commercial English-language network affiliates in Puerto Rico, all of which broadcast from San Juan and Mayagüez.

On September 11, 2014, WTCV became a Mega TV owned-and-operated station, following the sale of Spanish Broadcasting System through its License Management Agreement for $1.9 million, leaving its status as an Independent station, while its former owner, International Broadcasting Corporation continues to be its Licensee, until SBS will transfer WIOA (99.9 FM), WIOC (105.1 FM) and WZET (92.1 FM) to IBC's TV operations. Beginning in March 2015, WTCV's local programming will be produced by SBS Puerto Rico, which owns Z-93, La Nueva 94, Estereotempo and La Mega. The sale of WTCV with SBS was completed on September 1, 2015.

On January 12, 2018, WTCV announced that Conectao's por la Cocina, ¿Y Cual es su Opinion? and Descarao por la Noche had been canceled due to economic loss, as well as expiring contracts with local talent and production staff.

On September 24, 2019, WTCV and its satellite stations switched their virtual channel to 18.1 across all Puerto Rico.

Notable current on-air staff
 Antonio Sanchez "El Gangster" – El Circo
 Braulio Castillo – co-host of La Movida
 Jaime Bayly – Bayly
 Pedro Sevcec – Sevcec
 Alberto Cutié - Hablando Claro Con El Padre Alberto

Technical information

Subchannels

On February 17, 2009, WTCV signed off its analog signal and completed its move to digital.

Spectrum reallocation
On August 7, 2017, it was revealed that WTCV's over-the-air spectrum had been sold in the FCC's spectrum reallocation auction, fetching $4,737,874. WTCV would not sign off, but it would later share broadcast spectrum with WJPX, affiliated with América TeVé in Puerto Rico that covers the entire metropolitan area.

Satellite stations
WTCV can be seen across Puerto Rico on the following stations:

Notes:
1. WVEO was owned by Southwestern Broadcasting, and serves as a satellite of WKBM-TV from its 1974 sign-on until 1981 and WAPA-TV from 1982 until 1999.
2. WVOZ-TV used the callsign WIEC from its 1986 sign-on until 1993.

References

External links 
Mega TV

Mass media in San Juan, Puerto Rico
Television channels and stations established in 1984
Spanish Broadcasting System stations
TCV
1984 establishments in Puerto Rico